Ros bratel is a traditional Algerian Jewish tagine dish made with fresh fava beans, olive oil, and spices such as coriander. It is paired with couscous, and is commonly served on Shabbat, and today is popular among the Israeli and French Jewish communities.

Origin

Ros bratel originated several thousand years ago among members of the Algerian Jewish community who resided in Constantine, Algeria until their expulsion in the 1960s.

See also
Hamin
Sephardi cuisine
Kuru fasulye

References

Algerian cuisine
Algerian-Jewish culture in Israel
French cuisine
Israeli cuisine
Jews and Judaism in Algeria
Legume dishes
Sephardi Jewish cuisine
Sephardi Jewish culture in France
Sephardi Jewish culture in Israel